Arayidathupalam Junction is the busiest road intersection of Kozhikode city in India.

Mavoor Road
The western part of Mavoor Road is specifically referred to by that name.  The New Bus Station and the KSRTC Bus Station are located in this road.  The road has one of the busiest commercial parts of the city.  The road ends in Mananchira Square.

Medical College Road
The eastern road is called Medical College Road but it goes all the way to Mavoor village. Calicut Medical College is located in this road.  City suburbs like Kovoor Town, Chevayur, Kottooli and Pottammal are also located in this road.

Kannur Road
The northern road goes all the way to Kannur and Mangalore.

Meenchantha Bypass
The southern road crosses the Kalluthan Kadavu bridge and goes all the way to Malappuram and other southern cities of Kerala.

Major Organizations in Arayidathupalam

 Baby Memorial Hospital
 Vasan Eye Care Hospital
 Alsalama Eye care Hospital
 Commonwealth Trust Eye care Hospital
 District Prison
 Sarovaram Bio Park
 Varthaka Bhavan, Stadium Road
 Taluk Office, Stadium Road
 Emirates Airlines, Meenchantha Road
 BEM School, Stadium Road

See also
 
 Mavoor Road
 Pottammal
 Kottooly

References

Road junctions in India
Roads in Kozhikode